DYRS (91.7 FM), broadcasting as 91.7 Radyo Natin, is a radio station owned and operated by Manila Broadcasting Company. Its studio and transmitter are located at Brgy. Funda-Dalipe, San Jose de Buenavista, Antique.

References

Radio stations established in 1997
Radio stations in Antique (province)
Radyo Natin Network stations